"Go You Packers Go!" is the fight song of the Green Bay Packers, and the first for a professional American football team. It was written by Eric Karll, a commercial jingle writer in Milwaukee, and first played at a Packers football game by the Lumberjack Band in 1931.

In 1960, the NFL Marching Band recorded the song as part of the LP National Football League Marching Songs (issued on the RCA label LSP2292), complete with introduction by Bart Starr, then the Packers' quarterback.

A taped version of the song, recorded in 1992, is played at Lambeau Field immediately following the Packers' player introductions and after every time the Packers score an extra point.

In 2011, a CD of Go! Pack Go! was released by Madera Music and publisher Jeff Karll.  This is the first recorded version of the song containing the lyrics.

The shortened line from the song shouted by fans, "Go Pack Go!", is associated with a short jingle that is not part of the original fight song.

Original lyrics
The line "On, you Green and Gold, to glory," was originally "On, you Blue and Gold, to glory," reflecting the original team colors of the Green Bay Packers.

References

External links
Complete lyrics 
Packers web site Lee Remmel''' history page
Link to 1960 recording, in MP3, Midi and RealPlayer formats

History of the Green Bay Packers
National Football League fight songs
1931 songs